Harold Searson (3 June 1924 – 5 January 2013) was an English footballer, who played as a goalkeeper with Leeds United where he made 116 appearances from 1948 to 1953. Searson also played for Sheffield Wednesday, Mansfield Town and York City.

Searson died in January 2013 from cancer.

References

1924 births
2013 deaths
Leeds United F.C. players
Sheffield Wednesday F.C. players
Mansfield Town F.C. players
York City F.C. players
Place of birth missing
Association football goalkeepers
English footballers